Kamzarf is a 2019 Pakistani television series, produced by Hassan Zia under their production banner Mastermind Productions. It featured Junaid Khan, Rabab Hashim and Nadia Khan in lead roles.
The drama aired weekly episode on Geo Entertainment every Tuesday from 8 January to 11 June 2019.

Plot
Story of Aima (Nadia Khan), the eldest sister of her siblings Azhar (Junaid Khan), Asim (Ali Ansari) and Mona (Sumaiyya Bukhsh). Their parents died when she was 16 years old and she was left alone with her younger siblings, taking care of them as a mother, she wanted to marry her college friend but her father wanted her to take care of her siblings. Time lapse and she then appeared as an elderly women with her young siblings. Mona is still finishing her last semester, Azhar the second elder brother finds a girl (Nazish Jehangir) for himself and wanted to marry her but because of Aima's disagreements he couldn't and forced to married to a Tailor's daughter Fouzia (Rabab Hashim), whom he wasn't behaving really nice and quite harsh after marriage. Aima's uncle from America arrives, They have a young daughter Faria (Mariyam Nafees) who has a really liberal thought from which Asim is attracted to, so they decided to marry. Aima was also disagreeing to this marriage but Asim didn't listened, while Azhar formed a better relationship with his wife. While Aima meets his old love Nabeel (Alyy Khan), whom she wanted to marry, He is secretly married and has a child, he plans to marry Aima and take all her property, while Aima acting foolishly married him and gives him everything she had, while Faria, Asim's wife gets the house where the four siblings are living in form of a gift from her father, Aima opposes this decision and creates many misunderstandings in the house, while Mona founds a guy from University and they got married, Aima moves to Mona's house but couldn't live there more than two weeks she is left behind in a Woman's Asylum where the three siblings tried to find her but couldn't, because of Aima's unacceptable behavior and narrow-mindedness, she makes her life like hell and she was left alone at the end.

Cast

Production
The series was earlier titled Kasa-e-Zaat but the makers changed it to Kam Zarf.

Soundtrack

The title song " Na Baraf Na Pani" was sung by Shuja Haider. The music was composed by Shuja Haider and the lyrics were written by Omaya Arif.Which has more than 1.5 Million views on YouTube.

References

External links
Official website

2019 Pakistani television series debuts